The Germania Building is a historic Beaux-Arts/Classical Revival building in Milwaukee, Wisconsin.

Germania Building may also refer to the following in the United States:
Germania Bank Building (St. Paul), St. Paul, Minnesota
Germania Bank Building (New York City)
Germania Club Building, Chicago, Illinois
Germania Turnverein Building, Lancaster, Pennsylvania
Germania House, a hotel in St. Louis, Missouri
Germania Building Complex in Ann Arbor, Michigan
W New York Union Square, formerly the Germania Life Insurance Company Building, New York City

See also
Germania Club House